Ebenezer Thomas Davies, known as E. T. Davies (Pontycymer, Glamorgan 1903 – 1991) was a scholar, schoolmaster and Anglican priest in the Church in Wales. After obtaining First Class Honours in History at Cardiff University in 1927 he worked for his M.A. degree while pursuing a teaching career in the Garw valley and in Cardiff.

He was subsequently called to the ministry of the Church in Wales and served in the diocese of Monmouth, notably in the parish of Llangybi.

In 1953 he was made canon of Monmouth, and amongst the functions he assumed were those of Consultant Archivist to the Representative Body of the Church in Wales; Examining Chaplain to the Archbishop of Wales, and most notably editor of the Historical Society of the Church in Wales which position he held until 1973 editing volumes III through XXIV.

Among his many publications can be singled out: Religion in the Industrial Revolution in South Wales (Pantyfedwen Lectures) 1962; The Church in Wales in the Eighteenth Century (Handbook, Welsh Church Congress) 1953.

References

20th-century Welsh Anglican priests
Alumni of Cardiff University
1903 births
1991 deaths
People from Pontycymer